Merluccius is a genus of merluccid hakes from the Atlantic and Pacific Oceans, where mainly found relatively deep.

The generic name is derived from French mer ("sea") and Latin lucius, "pike."

Species
The 14 recognized species in this genus are:
 Merluccius albidus (Mitchill, 1818) (offshore silver hake)
 Merluccius angustimanus Garman, 1899 (Panama hake)
 Merluccius australis (F. W. Hutton, 1872) (southern hake) 
 Merluccius bilinearis (Mitchill, 1814) (silver hake)
 Merluccius capensis Castelnau, 1861 (shallow-water Cape hake)
 Merluccius gayi (Guichenot, 1848)
 M. g. gayi (Guichenot, 1848) (South Pacific hake)
 M. g. peruanus Ginsburg, 1954 (Peruvian hake)
 Merluccius hernandezi C. P. Mathews, 1985 (Cortez hake)
 Merluccius hubbsi Marini, 1933 (Argentine hake)
 Merluccius merluccius (Linnaeus, 1758) (European hake)
 Merluccius paradoxus Franca, 1960 (deep-water cape hake)
 Merluccius patagonicus Lloris & Matallanas, 2003 (Patagonian hake)
 Merluccius polli Cadenat, 1950 (Benguela hake)
 Merluccius productus (Ayres, 1855) (North Pacific hake)
 Merluccius senegalensis Cadenat, 1950 (Senegalese hake)

References

 
Merlucciidae
Marine fish genera
Taxa named by Constantine Samuel Rafinesque